The Aurangabad is a large coal field located in the east of India in Bihar. Aurangabad represents one of the largest coal reserve in India having estimated reserves of 3 billion tonnes of coal.

References 

Coalfields of India
Mining in Jharkhand